Lauren Elena Witzke (born February 9, 1988) is an American far-right political activist known for her anti-LGBT views and promotion of QAnon. Witzke was the Republican nominee in the 2020 United States Senate election in Delaware, which she lost to incumbent Democrat Chris Coons. She is a former TV show host for TruNews.

Early life and education 
Witzke was born on February 9, 1988, in Delmar, Delaware. She attended Goldey–Beacom College, where she earned a BBA in business management. At Goldey–Beacom, she played softball as a catcher and shortstop.

Career

2020 Senate election 

On September 16, 2020, Witzke won the Republican primary for the 2020 Senate election in Delaware with 57% of the vote, defeating attorney and former Marine James DeMartino. Witzke said that her opponent was a "RINO", an acronym for 'Republican in name only'. Her candidacy was not endorsed by the Delaware state Republican Party who had instead decided to endorse DeMartino. Witzke's Senate campaign was endorsed by white nationalist Nick Fuentes, who had marched in the August 2017 white nationalist rally in Charlottesville. Witzke accepted Fuentes' endorsement with the response of "Thank you, Nick!". During the general election campaign, Witzke claimed without evidence that Hunter Biden's laptop contained illicit images of "Chris Coons' daughter in addition to seven other underaged girls". PolitiFact rated the claim to be false.

In the November 2020 general election, Witzke was defeated by incumbent Senator Chris Coons 59-38%.

Media work 
After far-right radio host and conspiracy theorist Rick Wiles was hospitalized with COVID-19 in late May 2021, his organization TruNews announced that Witzke would be filling in for him as co-host of the program. After Wiles returned, Witzke was hired as a permanent co-host of his show. As of September 6, 2021, Witzke has been let go from TruNews. In October 2021, she revealed she had contracted COVID-19 and said she experienced a loss of senses and "brain fog". She blamed COVID-19 testing done at TruNews for making her aware of her infection.

Political views 
Witzke advocates closed borders and pronatalist family policies, similar to those implemented in Hungary; opposes all economic, political, and cultural globalization; and identifies as a traditionalist and Christian nationalist. She supports a ten-year moratorium on all immigration. Witzke has criticized former president Donald Trump for failing to follow through on his rhetorical commitment with executive orders to complete a southern border wall and prosecute political rival Hillary Clinton for mishandling classified information.

Witzke has appeared on VDARE, a website that the Anti-Defamation League has called a "xenophobic website" and the Southern Poverty Law Center a website that "regularly publishes articles by prominent white nationalists, race scientists and anti-Semites". Witzke tweeted out her interview with VDARE, writing, "In order to preserve America, we must first preserve American families, our values, and our culture." In October 2020, Witzke defended the far-right organization the Proud Boys and said at one point that the Proud Boys exemplified "patriotic masculinity" and thanked the group for providing security at her campaign rallies.

Abortion 
Witzke opposes abortion and supports overturning the 1973 Supreme Court decision Roe v. Wade. Upon the death of Ruth Bader Ginsburg in September 2020, Witzke said that "Ruth Bader Ginsberg's obsession with abortion overtly singled out blacks and minorities for extermination". Witzke also attacked her Democratic opponent Chris Coons for being a "Christian-hating baby killer".

Black Lives Matter 
Witzke has described Black Lives Matter as "violent terrorists" who want to "stoke societal unrest, and literally already has blood on their hands" referring to the 2020 Black Lives Matter riots in which David Dorn was killed by a burglar several miles away from riots in St. Louis.

COVID-19 
Witzke has said that COVID-19 is "satanic" and that COVID-19 vaccine is a "satanic plot" to cause "mass death".

Immigration 
Witzke has supported a complete ban on all immigration to the United States for ten years. She has also stated that "nationalist populism is the future".

LGBT people 
In March 2021, Witzke responded to a tweet from Richard Grenell about a trans woman who had attended CPAC by claiming that transgender people are "mentally ill" and "demonic". She also iterated her opposition to both same-sex marriage and gay conservatives being welcomed into the Republican Party. Witzke has also said that Christians should "reclaim the rainbow" and celebrate June (LGBT pride month) as "Christianity month".

Witzke said that the COVID-19 outbreak that afflicted TruNews was a "demonic attack" on the channel for having self-described "ex-gay" Milo Yiannopoulos and called him "Satan's favorite sodomite".

While speaking on an online panel on the post-Trump future of the Republican Party in March 2021, Witzke attacked conservative trans woman Blaire White, saying, "The best thing you can do for us is grow out your moustache and tell people not to live like you." On the same panel, Witzke also espoused the belief that trans people are "sexual predators" and "pedophiles".

QAnon 
Witzke has voiced support for the far-right conspiracy theory QAnon, which centers on claims that a cabal of Satanic, cannibalistic sexual abusers of children operating a global child sex trafficking ring conspired against former U.S. President Donald Trump during his term in office. During Hurricane Ian, Witzke suggested that "elites" may have created the devastating hurricane as a "deep state" attempt to punish Florida Governor Ron DeSantis and particularly conservative areas of the state. On the conservative "Shots Fired" streaming broadcast, Witzke claimed that she has "no doubt" that the technology exists to control weather catastrophes.

Russia 
At the 2022 Conservative Political Action Conference, Witzke described Russia as "a Christian nationalist nation", and said "I identify more with Putin's Christian values than I do with Joe Biden." She stated that "Christian Nationalist countries are a threat to the global regime".

Personal life 
Witzke was raised Methodist. She is a former drug user who reformed through a Pentecostal faith-based recovery program for which she later became program director. She is a recent Evangelical Protestant convert to Orthodox Christianity, received within the Russian Orthodox Church Outside of Russia (ROCOR), and was a catechumen during her Senate campaign. Witzke has stated she believes in the flat Earth theory.

Electoral history

References

Further reading 
 

1988 births
Activists from Delaware
Alt-right activists
Alt-right politicians
American conspiracy theorists
American nationalists
Christian nationalists
College softball players in the United States
Critics of Black Lives Matter
Delaware Republicans
Discrimination against LGBT people in the United States
Far-right politicians in the United States
Flat Earth proponents
Goldey–Beacom College alumni
Living people
QAnon
Right-wing politics in the United States
Right-wing populism in the United States
Russian Orthodox Christians from the United States
Former Methodists
Former evangelicals
Converts to Eastern Orthodoxy from Protestantism
Christians from Delaware
Anti-LGBT sentiment
COVID-19 conspiracy theorists
Candidates in the 2020 United States Senate elections